Howard Evans (29 February 1944 in Chard, Somerset – 17 March 2006), was a British trumpeter.

Having played in the band of the Welsh Guards and the London Symphony Orchestra, Evans moved into theatre work. He was a member of the line-up of the Albion Band which played for 'Larkrise' at the National Theatre. As a result of this, he was recruited as a member of the newly formed Home Service. Along with John Kirkpatrick, Evans played on Martin Carthy's albums Because It's There (1979) and Out of the Cut (1982) and toured with Carthy and Kirkpatrick sporadically during 1982 and 1983 in a line-up which, with the addition of Martin Brinsford and Roger Williams, later became Brass Monkey.

In 1965 he married Jacqueline Allen and they had one son and two daughters.

Howard Evans died on 17 March 2006, following a long battle with cancer.

References

1944 births
2006 deaths
Welsh Guards soldiers
English trumpeters
Male trumpeters
British folk rock musicians
People from Chard, Somerset
Deaths from cancer in England
20th-century trumpeters
20th-century British male musicians
The Albion Band members
Brass Monkey (band) members
Home Service members